Bhaktivedanta Tripurari, also known as Swami BV Tripurari and formerly as Tripurari Swami, is an American author, poet, and guru, described as "a prominent master in the Gaudiya Vaishnava lineage", and "one of the leading practitioners of Bhakti-yoga in the West".

Biography
Tripurari Swami was born Thomas Beaudry in 1949 in Teaneck, New Jersey. He devoted his youth to the pursuit of transcendental knowledge and mystic experience. His lifetime of spiritual practice and teaching has brought him notice in spiritual circles around the world and earned the appreciation of scholars and practitioners alike. He has been described as helping "scholars... apprehend more clearly the dynamic nature of the Krsna consciousness movement."

Tripurari Swami met his initiating guru, A. C. Bhaktivedanta Swami Prabhupada, in the spring of 1972, and joined the International Society for Krishna Consciousness. Tripurari relates that he felt as though he had met a long-lost friend, as Prabhupada blessed him with his all-knowing glance. Over the years that followed, Prabhupada showered Tripurari with affection and repeatedly expressed his appreciation for Tripurari's selfless service and ability to inspire others. In 1974 Prabhupada instructed Tripurari in a widely circulated letter, "So you organize freely. You are the incarnation of book distribution. Take the leadership and do the needful." Accordingly, Tripurari Swami has set an example of one who is independently thoughtful and capable of making an insightful literary contribution to the world.

Before accepting sannyasa in 1975, Tripurari Swami was known as Tripurari dasa.

Shortly before Prabhupada's death, he suggested that, should the need arise, his students could receive further instruction from his elder "godbrother" (a disciple of the same guru), Bhakti Rakshak Sridhar. Tripurari Swami was present when Prabhupada gave this instruction, however, it was not until several years later, in the midst of the confusion that followed Prabhupada's departure, that it would affect the course of Tripurari Swami's spiritual pursuit.

Tripurari Swami expresses his experience of hearing from and serving Swami Sridhara thus: "With the setting of the sun of the manifest pastimes of our beloved preceptor, Srila A. C. Bhaktivedanta Swami Prabhupada, the world became dark. Then suddenly in the shadows of the night the reflected light of the moonlike discourse of Srila B. R. Sridhara Deva Goswami flooded the path with new light and dynamic insight that illumined the inner landscape, leading me to the soul of Srila Prabhupada and Gaudiya Vaisnavism." The association and instructions of Swami B. R. Sridhara profoundly affected Tripurari Swami, and under his guidance, Tripurari Swami (now known as Swami Bhaktivedanta Tripurari) began initiating his own students in 1985.

Gaudiya Vaishnavite Society
After the death of ISKCON founder Bhaktivedanta Swami Prabhupada, Tripurari Swami become the leader of a reform groups opposed other ISKCON teachers' accepting veneration as gurus (zonal acharyas) in the same manner as Prabhupada. At the same time, he had received initiation from Prabhupada's "godbrother" (a disciple of the same guru), Bhakti Rakshak Sridhar. The reform groups formed in 1985 the "Gaudiya Vaishnavite Society" (GVS), and later, Tripurari established also a religious order and monastery, the "Sri Caitanya Sangha". In 1988, the GVS began to print periodical The Clarian Call. The new organisation remains original principles of the ISKCON, however, its members trace their guru lineage from Bhakti Rakshak Sridhar.

Reviews
In 1998, Yoga Journal gave Tripurari Swami's Aesthetic Vedanta a one-paragraph review In 2002, Bhagavad Gita: Its Feeling and Philosophy, was reviewed in Yoga Journal, and then by Arvind Sharma in 2005 for the Journal of Vaishnava Studies.

Publications
Rasa – Love Relationships in Transcendence, Mandala, 1995. 
Ancient Wisdom for Modern Ignorance, Mandala, 1995. 
Jiva Goswami's Tattva-Sandarbha: Sacred India's Philosophy of Ecstasy, Mandala, 1996. 
Aesthetic Vedanta: The Sacred Path of Passionate Love, Mandala, 1998. 
Bhagavad-gita: Its Feeling and Philosophy, Mandala, 2001. 
"Bhagavad-gita: Seeing Nonviolence in the Violent Play of God." In Steven J. Rosen, ed., Holy War: Violence and the Bhagavad-gita, Deepak Heritage Books, 2002. 
Form of Beauty, with B. G. Sharma. Mandala, 2005 (2nd edition). 
Gopala-tapani Upanisad. Audarya, 2004. 
Siksastakam of Sri Caitanya. Mandala, 2006. 
Sacred Preface, Darshan Press, 2016.

References

External links
 Personal website.
 The Harmonist of the Sri Caitanya Sanga, a.k.a. Audarya, publishes articles relevant to Gaudiya Vaishnavism under Tripurari Swami editorial supervision.
 Srila Bhakti Raksak Sridhar Dev-Goswami Maharaj - a hagiography from the organization he founded, Sri Chaitanya Saraswat Math.

20th-century Hindu philosophers and theologians
21st-century Hindu philosophers and theologians
20th-century Hindu religious leaders
21st-century Hindu religious leaders
American spiritual teachers
American theologians
American male writers
American non-fiction writers
American Hare Krishnas
Former International Society for Krishna Consciousness religious figures
Founders of new religious movements
Hindu missionaries
Hindu monks
Hindu new religious movements
Gaudiya religious leaders
Presidents of religious organizations
Living people
1949 births
People from Teaneck, New Jersey